The Sisseton Carnegie Library, located at 215 Oak Street, East, in Sisseton, South Dakota, is a Carnegie library built in 1916.  It was listed on the National Register of Historic Places in 1996.  It was by then also known as the Pohlen Center and as the Heritage Museum of Roberts County.

It is a Classical Revival-style brick building on a pink granite foundation.

References

External links

Museums in Roberts County, South Dakota
Carnegie libraries in South Dakota		
National Register of Historic Places in South Dakota
Neoclassical architecture in South Dakota
Library buildings completed in 1916
Roberts County, South Dakota
History museums in South Dakota